Pedro and Me is an autobiographical graphic novel by Judd Winick regarding his friendship with AIDS educator Pedro Zamora after the two met while on the reality television series The Real World: San Francisco. It was published in September 2000.

Awards

Pedro and Me won numerous awards such as:
GLAAD Media Award for Best Comic Book
Publishers Weekly Best Book (2000)
Bay Area Book Reviewers Award for Best in Children's Literature (2000)
Eisner Nomination for Best Original Graphic Novel (2000)
Robert F. Sibert Informational Book Honor Award (2001)
Notable Children's Book Selection, American Library Association (2001)
American Library Association Gay, Lesbian, Bisexual, Transgender Roundtable Nonfiction Honor book
YALSA (Young Adult Library Services Association) Quick Pick for Reluctant Readers
YALSA Notable Graphic Novels
Bulletin Blue Ribbon Book
America's Award for Children's and Young Adult Literature Highly Recommended List (Award sponsored by the national Consortium of Latin American Studies Programs—CLASP)

References

External links

 Rational Magic review of book
 Comics Bulletin review of book

2000 comics debuts
2000 graphic novels
2000 children's books
2000s LGBT literature
Autobiographical graphic novels
Children's books about friendship
Children's non-fiction books
GLAAD Media Award for Outstanding Comic Book winners
LGBT-related graphic novels
LGBT-related children's novels
The Real World (TV series)
Henry Holt and Company books
LGBT literature in the United States
HIV/AIDS in literature